Dobroslav Paraga (born 9 December 1960) is a Croatian right-wing politician. He was first president of the Croatian Party of Rights, after the party was reestablished in 1991. In 1993 he founded the Croatian Party of Rights 1861 following a political split from Anto Đapić.

Background
In his early days Paraga advocated the secession of Croatia from Yugoslavia which led to persecution by the Communist authorities. 

When a multi-party system was established in Croatia, he initially joined the Croatian Democratic Union (HDZ) of Franjo Tuđman. However, involvement with the party clearly indicated that there was variation in sentiment among its members. 

Paraga came to feel the HDZ was not the radical party which he had expected, and so the party split. He and a delegation of like-minded radicals formed the Croatian Party of Rights (HSP). His party formed its own militia, the Croatian Defence Forces (HOS). In an interview in 2000, Paraga stated his party was “for a Croatia to the Drina, and for a Bosnia and Herzegovina to the Adriatic”.

Paraga and the HSP had had hopes of becoming the major political factor before the 1992 presidential and parliamentary elections, but those hopes did not materialise. The HSP did enter the Croatian Parliament and Paraga came fourth among presidential candidates, but it was clear that the party was far from its target. Another blow came in the form of high treason charges against Paraga and his associate Anto Đapić, who were stripped of their parliamentary immunity. Those charges were ultimately dropped, but the most serious blow for Paraga came when Đapić turned against him and took over the leadership of the HSP at the 1993 party convention in Kutina. Paraga accused Đapić of being in cahoots with Tuđman and tried to retrieve party leadership in court.

Modern activity
Following the failure of the effort and second split with fellow party members, in 1995 Paraga founded a party called Croatian Party of Rights 1861, claiming to be the true descendant of the 19th century party in Austria-Hungary.

References

External links
 Biography

1960 births
Living people
Politicians from Zagreb
Croatian Democratic Union politicians
Representatives in the modern Croatian Parliament
Candidates in the 1992 Croatian presidential election
Croatian Party of Rights 1861 politicians
Croatian Party of Rights politicians
Croatian nationalists
Croatian dissidents
Amnesty International prisoners of conscience held by Yugoslavia
Croatian independence activists